Uvidicolus is a monotypic genus of lizard in the family Carphodactylidae. The genus contains the sole species Uvidicolus sphyrurus, also known commonly as the border thick-tailed gecko. The species is endemic to Australia.

Geographic range
U. sphyrurus is found in rocky highlands of the Murray-Darling Basin, in New South Wales and southern Queensland, Australia.

Habitat

Description

Reproduction
U. sphyrurus is oviparous.

Taxonomy
Uvidicolus sphyrurus is sometimes placed in the genus Underwoodisaurus.

References

Further reading
Cogger HG (2014). Reptiles and Amphibians of Australia, Seventh Edition. Clayton, Victoria, Australia: CSIRO Publishing. xxx + 1,033 pp. . (Uvidicolus sphyrurus, p. 285).
Ogilby JD (1892). "Descriptions of Three New Australian Lizards". Records of the Australian Museum 2 (1): 6–11. (Gymnodactylus sphyrurus, new species, pp. 6–8).
Oliver PM, Bauer AM (2011). "Systematics and evolution of the Australian knob-tail geckos (Nephrurus, Carphodactylidae, Gekkota): Pleisomorphic grades and biome shifts through the Miocene". Molecular Phylogenetics and Evolution 59 (3): 664–674. (Uvidicolus, new genus; Uvidicolus sphyrurus, new combination).
Wilson S, Swan G (2013). A Complete Guide to Retiles of Australia, Fourth Edition. Sydney: New Holland Publishers. 522 pp. .

Geckos of Australia
Monotypic lizard genera
Carphodactylidae
Taxa named by Paul M. Oliver
Taxa named by Aaron M. Bauer
Taxonomy articles created by Polbot